HSwMS Carlskrona (in Swedish: HMS Carlskrona) is the longest vessel in the Swedish Navy at . Only , the submarine rescue vessel, has more displacement. She was originally designed as a minelayer and is also used for exercise expeditions. She replaced  in both roles.

Construction and Career
Carlskrona built at the Karlskrona shipyard as the largest ship ever built at the shipyard. Not only was the ship designed as a minelayer, but it was also constructed to be used as the Swedish Navy's long-travel ship.

The launch took place on 28 May 1980 with 3,000 invited guests, where the king Carl XVI Gustaf christened the ship. A music corps and ceremonial company was included in ceremony and among the guests were Defense Minister Eric Krönmark, the Chief of the Navy, Vice Admiral Per Rudberg and the Director General of the Defence Materiel Administration Ove Ljung. On 19 March 1982 the ship was delivered to the navy, where she replaced  and the long travel ship.

During the Cold War, large minelayers like Carlskrona were very important in the Swedish defense strategy, causing the ship to be without a role after the restructuring of the Swedish Armed Forces in the early 2000s. Carlskrona was refitted in 2002. The refit left the ship fit for active service until at least 2018–20. In 2009–2010 she was modified for the Ocean Patrol Vessel (OPV) role and redesignated from M to P (P04). Carlskrona took part in the EUNAVFOR operation in the Gulf of Aden (Somalia) in 2010. She left the naval base at Karlskrona, Sweden on 13 March 2010, and commenced her mission as HQ ship for the EU operation on 15 April.

On 6 May 2016 Carlskrona collided with the ferry Yxlan outside Karlskrona in the Baltic Sea. The ship received minor damage and returned to active duty only ten days later.

In August 2016 the ship was dry-docked to give the ship a 10 year extension refit that will extend its service-life to 2025. The ship was handed back to the Swedish Navy on 16 June 2017.

Both the 57 mm guns were removed. The aft gun was removed when the helicopter pad was expanded and the forward 57 mm gun was removed when the ship was mothballed in 2007 as it was of an older type that was no longer used on any other ships in the Swedish Navy.

On 13 May 2022, Carlskrona took part in a PASSEX training with the Finnish and American navies in the northern Baltic Sea.

References

  3rd Surface Warfare Flotilla - HMS Carlskrona
  Örlogsboken 2003

Naval ships of Sweden
Ships of the Swedish Navy
1980 ships
Ships built in Karlskrona